Jan Klingers (28 August 1929 in Zaandam – 22 April 1994 in Zaandam) was a Dutch sprint canoer who competed in the early 1950s. At the 1952 Summer Olympics in Helsinki, he finished eighth in the K-2 1000 m event and ninth in the K-2 10000 m event.

References
Sports-reference.com profile

1929 births
1994 deaths
Canoeists at the 1952 Summer Olympics
Dutch male canoeists
Olympic canoeists of the Netherlands
Sportspeople from Zaanstad
20th-century Dutch people